Aegean Yacht is a shipyard and ship builder based in Bodrum, Turkey. The company was established in 1976 by Sinan Ozer.  It designs, builds and sells turn key yachts internationally.

Profile 
Aegean Yacht owns 15.000 m2 of a seaside boatyard and builds steel vessels up to 80m LOA with MCA class, working on a custom line principle to give its clients practically unlimited possibilities in realizing their ideas.

So far Aegean Yacht has completed more than 40 yachts from 16 to 50 meters LOA, some of which have been exported to Australia, Caribbean, Thailand, Egypt, Eritrea, Maldives, Italy, France, Germany, Portugal, Spain, Croatia, Greece, Canary Islands, Malta, Djibouti, United Arab Emirates, Russia and many other world destinations.

List of yachts

See also
 List of shipbuilders and shipyards 
 Luxury yachts
 List of large sailing yachts

References

External links 
 Aegean Yacht
 How to buy a Gulet

Turkey
Manufacturing companies established in 1976
Turkish brands
Turkish companies established in 1976
Bodrum